Halie or Halia (Ancient Greek: Ἁλίη or Ἁλία Haliê means 'the dweller in the sea' or 'the briney') is the name of the following characters in Greek mythology:
 Halie, the "ox-eyed" Nereid, sea-nymph daughter of the 'Old Man of the Sea' Nereus and the Oceanid Doris. Halia and her other sisters appear to Thetis when she cries out in sympathy for the grief of Achilles at the slaying of his friend Patroclus.
 Halia, a nymph who lived on an island that would later be named Rhodes after her only daughter, Rhodos (or Rhode). Halia was the daughter of Thalassa, sister of the Telchines, and mother of Rhodos and six sons by Poseidon. Shortly after Aphrodite’s birth, the goddess was traveling the oceans. When Halia’s young sons unfairly and inhospitably refused to let Aphrodite land upon their shore, the goddess cursed them with insanity, for their lack of hospitality. In their madness, they raped Halia. As punishment, Poseidon buried them in the island’s sea-caverns. Halia later threw herself into the sea; Rhodians argue that she became the goddess Leucothea. However, Leucothea is identified with Ino in all other sources.
 Halia, daughter of Sybaris. In a sacred grove of Artemis, she encountered an enormous serpent that mated with her; their offspring were the first members of the clan Ophiogeneis ("Serpent-born").
 Halie, daughter of Tyllus, an autochthon. She married Cotys, son of Manes, an early king of Lydia, bearing him two sons, Asies and Atys, who succeeded Manes as king of Lydia.
The plural form, haliae, is used as a name for marine nymphs in general.

See also
Hali (disambiguation)
Hayley (given name), including variant spellings
Haley (surname)

Notes

References 

 Apollodorus, Apollodorus, The Library, with an English Translation by Sir James George Frazer, F.B.A., F.R.S. in 2 Volumes. Cambridge, Massachusetts, Harvard University Press; London, William Heinemann Ltd. 1921. . Online version at the Perseus Digital Library.

 Callimachus, Callimachus and Lycophron with an English translation by A. W. Mair ; Aratus, with an English translation by G. R. Mair, London: W. Heinemann, New York: G. P. Putnam 1921. Internet Archive
 Callimachus, Works. A.W. Mair. London: William Heinemann; New York: G.P. Putnam's Sons. 1921. Greek text available at the Perseus Digital Library.
 Claudius Aelianus, Varia Historia translated by Thomas Stanley (d.1700) edition of 1665. Online version at the Topos Text Project.
 Claudius Aelianus, Claudii Aeliani de natura animalium libri xvii, varia historia, epistolae, fragmenta, Vol 2. Rudolf Hercher. In Aedibus B.G. Teubneri. Lipsiae. 1866. Greek text available at the Perseus Digital Library. 
 Diodorus Siculus, The Library of History translated by Charles Henry Oldfather. Twelve volumes. Loeb Classical Library. Cambridge, Massachusetts: Harvard University Press; London: William Heinemann, Ltd. 1989. Vol. 3. Books 4.59–8. Online version at Bill Thayer's Web Site
 Diodorus Siculus, Bibliotheca Historica. Vol 1-2. Immanel Bekker. Ludwig Dindorf. Friedrich Vogel. in aedibus B. G. Teubneri. Leipzig. 1888-1890. Greek text available at the Perseus Digital Library.
 Dionysius of Halicarnassus. Roman Antiquities, Volume I: Books 1-2, translated by Earnest Cary. Loeb Classical Library No. 319. Cambridge, Massachusetts, Harvard University Press, 1937. Online version by Bill Thayer. Online version at Harvard University Press.
 Dionysius of Halicarnassus, Antiquitatum Romanarum quae supersunt, Vol I-IV. . Karl Jacoby. In Aedibus B.G. Teubneri. Leipzig. 1885. Greek text available at the Perseus Digital Library.
 Herodotus, Histories, A. D. Godley (translator), Cambridge, Massachusetts: Harvard University Press, 1920; . Online version at the Perseus Digital Library.
Hesiod, Theogony from The Homeric Hymns and Homerica with an English Translation by Hugh G. Evelyn-White, Cambridge, MA.,Harvard University Press; London, William Heinemann Ltd. 1914. Online version at the Perseus Digital Library. Greek text available from the same website.
 Homer, The Iliad with an English Translation by A.T. Murray, Ph.D. in two volumes. Cambridge, MA., Harvard University Press; London, William Heinemann, Ltd. 1924. . Online version at the Perseus Digital Library.
 Homer, Homeri Opera in five volumes. Oxford, Oxford University Press. 1920. . Greek text available at the Perseus Digital Library.
 Kerényi, Carl, The Gods of the Greeks, Thames and Hudson, London, 1951.
 Sophocles, The Philoctetes of Sophocles edited with introduction and notes by Sir Richard Jebb. Cambridge. Cambridge University Press. 1893. Online version at the Perseus Digital Library.
 Sophocles, Sophocles. Vol 2: Ajax. Electra. Trachiniae. Philoctetes with an English translation by F. Storr. The Loeb classical library, 21. Francis Storr. London; New York. William Heinemann Ltd.; The Macmillan Company. 1913. Greek text available at the Perseus Digital Library.

Nereids
Deities in the Iliad